Rypdal is a surname. Notable people with the surname include:

Arild Rypdal (1934–2015), Norwegian author, pilot and engineer
Inger Lise Rypdal (born 1949), Norwegian singer and actress
Isak Rypdal, Norwegian music producer and founder of Crab Key Records
Jakob Rypdal (1926–2015), Norwegian triple jumper
Jakob Terjesønn Rypdal (born 1989), Norwegian Electronica artist and guitarist
Peter L. Rypdal (1909–1988), Norwegian fiddler and famous traditional folk music composer
Terje Rypdal (born 1947), Norwegian guitarist and composer 
Thale Rypdal barnebarn 9år

See also
Rydal (disambiguation)